Make Mine Laughs is a 1949 film directed by Richard Fleischer. The film was a compilation of comic scenes and musical numbers from older and newer RKO Studios films.

Make Mine Laughs was the second of four RKO Radio "pastiche" films, composed largely of musical and comedy highlights from previous RKO productions. Comedian Gil Lamb hosts the proceedings, finding time to make satirical comments about the opening credits and to perform his "swallowing the harmonica" specialty.

The film clips include two short subjects, Leon Errol's Beware of Redheads and one of RKO's Flicker Flashbacks entries, both presented in their entirety. Also featured are Frances Langford singing "Moonlight Over the Islands" (from The Bamboo Blonde), Anne Shirley and Dennis Day duetting on "If You Happen to Find a Heart" (from Music in Manhattan), and specialties performed by bandleaders Frankie Carle and Freddie Fisher, ventriloquist Robert Lamouret, and dance teams Manuel & Marita Viera and Rosario & Antonio.

Make Mine Laughs was withdrawn from distribution after Ray Bolger and Jack Haley brought suit against RKO for unauthorized use of their performances (Bolger's boxing pantomime in Four Jacks and a Jill (1944) and Haley's "Who Killed Vaudeville?" number from George White's Scandals (1945)). The studio avoided any future lawsuits by confining its variety-show features Footlight Varieties and Merry Mirthquakes to new numbers staged especially for the films, and comedy sequences from RKO's backlog of short subjects.

References

External links
 

1949 films
Films directed by Richard Fleischer
1949 musical comedy films
American musical comedy films
American black-and-white films
1940s English-language films
1940s American films